José Joaquín Casimiro Olañeta y Güemes (1795–1860) was a nephew of Pedro Antonio Olañeta who, after working for him, turned against his uncle in favor of Bolivian independence. He faced criticism as being two-faced or Machiavellian, in part because the shift occurred in a matter of weeks. He went on to serve as an advisor to Antonio José de Sucre. Casimiro opposed his land being linked in a nation with Argentina.

Olañeta was President of the Bolivian constituent assembly in 1826. He was Minister of Finance of Peru from August 1837 to November 1837. He served as the President of the Chamber of Senators of Bolivia in 1846 as well as a Peruvian representative in Chile.

References 

Presidents of the Senate of Bolivia
Presidents of the Chamber of Deputies (Bolivia)
Peruvian Ministers of Economy and Finance
People from Chuquisaca Department
University of Charcas alumni
1795 births
1860 deaths
19th-century Bolivian politicians
Interior ministers of Bolivia